This is a list of provincial ministers of Zambia as of September 2021.  All are members of the United Party for National Development. All ministers are elected members of Parliament except one who is a nominated minister by the President of the Republic of Zambia.

List

References

Lists of political office-holders in Zambia